Minnatullah Rahmani (7 April 1913 – 20 March 1991) was an Indian Sunni Muslim scholar who served as the first General Secretary of All India Muslim Personal Law Board. He was an alumnus of Darul Uloom Nadwatul Ulama and Darul Uloom Deoband, and a member of Bihar Legislative Assembly. He also served as the General Secretary of the Jamiat Ulama Bihar. His father Muhammad Ali Mungeri was the founder of Nadwatul Ulama and his son Wali Rahmani established the Rahmani30 institute.

Biography
Minnatullah Rahmani was born in Munger on 7 April 1913. His father Muhammad Ali Mungeri was a founding figure of the Nadwatul Ulama in Lucknow.

Rahmani received his primary education in Munger and went to Hyderabad, where he studied Arabic grammar, syntax and logic with Mufti Abd al-Lateef. He enrolled at the Darul Uloom Nadwatul Ulama and studied there for four years. In 1349 AH, he moved to Darul Uloom Deoband, where he studied Sahih Bukhari with Hussain Ahmad Madani and graduated from there in 1352 AH. His other teachers included Asghar Hussain Deobandi and Muhammad Shafi Usmani.

In 1935, Rahmani was appointed the General Secretary of the Jamiat Ulama Bihar. Abul Muhasin Muhammad Sajjad founded the Muslim Independent Party in 1935 and Rahmani was appointed as its member. Through it, he was elected as a member of Bihar Legislative Assembly in 1937. He was appointed as the Sajjada Nashin of Khanqah-e-Rahmani, Munger in 1361 AH and a member of the executive council of Darul Uloom Deoband in 1955, a post he served until his death. Alongside Muhammad Tayyib Qasmi, he played a key role in establishing the All India Muslim Personal Law Board and was appointed its first General Secretary on 28 December 1972, in the inception meeting. In 1964, he participated in the World Muslim Congress as a delegate of India. In 1945, Rahmani re-established the Jamia Rahmania, a well known madrassa in Munger, India. He died on 20 March 1991.

Legacy
Rahmani's son Wali Rahmani established the Rahmani30 and formerly served as the general secretary of the All India Muslim Personal Law Board. Shah Imran Hasan wrote his biography Hayat-e Rahmani: Maulana Minnatullah Rahmani ki Zindagi ka Ilmi aur Tarikhi Mutala’a which has a foreword from Akhtarul Wasey.

References

Bibliography
 
 
 
 

1913 births
1991 deaths
People from Munger district
Darul Uloom Nadwatul Ulama alumni
Darul Uloom Deoband alumni
Deobandis